Linden Hall may refer to:

Places

England
Linden Hall, Northumberland, Longhorsley

United States
Ricards House–Linden Hall, Bridgeville, Delaware, listed on the National Register of Historic Places (NRHP) in Sussex County
Dr. Charles and Susan Skinner House and Outbuildings, AKA Linden Hall, Warren County, North Carolina, a plantation house on the National Register of Historic Places (NRHP)
Linden Hall (school), Lititz, Pennsylvania, a girls' boarding school
Linden Hall at Saint James Park, Lower Tyrone Township, Fayette County, Pennsylvania, an historic estate listed on the National Register of Historic Places, now used as a conference center and hotel.

Persons
Linden Hall (athlete) (born 1991), Australian middle-distance runner

See also
Linden House (disambiguation)
The Lindens (disambiguation)
Linden (disambiguation)